Una Power is an English-born Irish card reader and author, notable for her appearance on The Psychic Zone on Dublin's 98 and occasional guest slots on TV3's Ireland AM series. She has previously worked with the BBC, as well as KFM, a local station in County Kildare. She currently resides in Levitstown near Athy. She meets clients at her office in central Dublin in addition to her premium telephone service and media appearances. The Psychic Zone is a phone-in show, broadcast from 22:00 to midnight on Fridays and Sundays, and in late 2008 it was changed to just the Sunday show. In January 2009, Dublin's 98 released its new schedule without Power's show, a change she did not predict.

References

External links
 At dublins98.ie

Year of birth missing (living people)
Living people
British emigrants to Ireland
Irish expatriates in England
Dublin's 98FM presenters
Irish women radio presenters
Irish television presenters
Irish women television presenters
People from County Kildare
Radio personalities from the Republic of Ireland